This is a list of events in British radio during 1972.

Events

January
19 January – The government announces the lifting of all restrictions on broadcasting hours on television and radio.

February
No events.

March
 31 March – BBC Radio 2 airs its final Breakfast Special.

April
 1 April – BBC Radio 2 moves its daily start time to 5.00am, representing a slight increase to their daily broadcasting hours, apart from on Sundays on which its day continues to begin at 6.55am.
 2 April – First edition of the comedy panel game I'm Sorry I Haven't a Clue is aired on BBC Radio 4. In 2020 (when it will still be running) the programme will be voted the greatest radio comedy of all time by a panel convened by Radio Times.
 3 April – Terry Wogan joins Radio 2 to present the new weekday breakfast show.

May
No events.

June
No events.

July
12 July – Following the enabling of The Sound Broadcasting Act 1972, The Independent Broadcasting Authority is formed, paving the way for the launch of Independent Local Radio.

August
 25 August – Following a decision by the government to restrict the BBC to twenty local radio stations, the corporation responds by closing BBC Radio Durham. Its resources are transferred to Carlisle where BBC Radio Carlisle, later BBC Radio Cumbria, is launched.

September
 24 September – Pick of the Pops is broadcast for the  final time.

October
The Independent Broadcasting Authority invites applications for the first two local radio licences in London: one for a general and entertainment station, the other for news and information. The licence for the entertainment service sees eight organisations applying, many of them with established entertainment pedigrees, including Associated Television and Isle of Man broadcaster Manx Radio.
1 October – The first edition of a new Sunday teatime programme Solid Gold Sixty is broadcast on BBC Radio 1. Presented by Tom Browne, the programme consists of two hours featuring the Radio One playlist tracks which are not in the Top 20, followed by a one-hour Top 20 rundown from 6pm - 7pm (which is carried also on BBC Radio 2's FM transmitters).
5 October – Due to high demand by residents who do not have VHF/FM on their radios, BBC Radio Oxford begins broadcasting on 202 metres medium wave (1484 kHz).

November
 4 November – Radios 2 and 4 begin broadcasting in stereo in South East England. Stereo is rolled out to the rest of the country over subsequent years.

December
No events.

Station debuts
 Hereford Hospital Radio

Closing this year
25 August – BBC Radio Durham (1968–1972)

Programme debuts
 11 April – I'm Sorry I Haven't a Clue on BBC Radio 4 (1972–Present)
 Unknown – Milligna (or Your Favourite Spike) on BBC Radio 4 (1972)

Continuing radio programmes

1940s
 Sunday Half Hour (1940–2018)
 Desert Island Discs (1942–Present)
 Down Your Way (1946–1992)
 Letter from America (1946–2004)
 Woman's Hour (1946–Present)
 A Book at Bedtime (1949–Present)

1950s
 The Archers (1950–Present)
 The Today Programme (1957–Present)
 The Navy Lark (1959–1977)
 Sing Something Simple (1959–2001)
 Your Hundred Best Tunes (1959–2007)

1960s
 Farming Today (1960–Present)
 In Touch (1961–Present)
 The Men from the Ministry (1962–1977)
 I'm Sorry, I'll Read That Again (1964–1973)
 Petticoat Line (1965–1979)
 The World at One (1965–Present)
 The Official Chart (1967–Present)
 Just a Minute (1967–Present)
 The Living World (1968–Present)
 The Organist Entertains (1969–2018)

1970s
 PM (1970–Present)
 Start the Week (1970–Present)
 Week Ending (1970–1998)
 You and Yours (1970–Present)

Ending this year
 Unknown – Lines from My Grandfather's Forehead (1971–1972)

Births
23 January – Harriet Scott, radio presenter
27 January – Wynne Evans, singer and BBC Radio Wales presenter
10 April – Chris Corcoran, Welsh comedian and broadcaster
28 April – Anita Anand, journalist and broadcast presenter
3 May – Katya Adler, broadcast journalist
14 June – Shaun Keaveny, DJ
30 August – Leo Green, jazz saxophonist and radio presenter
3 November – Nemone (Metaxas), DJ
16 November – Daniel P. Carter, rock guitarist and radio DJ
14 December – Miranda Hart, comic actress
17 December – Stephen Clements, Northern Irish DJ (died 2020)

Deaths
2 March – Franklin Engelmann, presenter (b. 1908)
15 October – Douglas Smith, announcer (b. 1924)
15 November – Freddie Grisewood, presenter (b. 1888)

See also 
 1972 in British music
 1972 in British television
 1972 in the United Kingdom
 List of British films of 1972

References

Radio
British Radio, 1972 In
Years in British radio